is a passenger railway station located in the city of Gobō, Wakayama Prefecture, Japan. The station is operated by the private Kishū Railway. The station is named after the Wakayama Prefectural Hidaka High School, whose back gate is located adjacent to the station.

Lines

Station layout
The station consists solely of a side platform located next to the single track. The only entrance to the station is located on the Gobo-bound end of the platform. No ticket gates are present within the station premises as the station is unmanned. There is a waiting shelter located on the platform, but there is no station building or toilet.

Adjacent stations

History
 was a former railway station which opened on 15 June 1931. The station was closed on 8 December 1941 and was subsequently demolished. Gakumon Station was built near the site of where Chugakumae Station had been located, and was opened on 10 August 1979 as an infill station.

Passenger statistics
In fiscal 2019, the station was used by an average of 9 passengers daily (boarding passengers only).

Surrounding Area
 Wakayama Prefectural Hidaka High School
 Hidaka River
Gobo City Fujita Elementary School
Taisei Junior High School

See also
List of railway stations in Japan

References

External links

Railway stations in Wakayama Prefecture
Railway stations in Japan opened in 1979
Gobō, Wakayama